This is a list of post-secondary institutions in Malaysia. Post-secondary education in Malaysia is organised upon the Malaysian Qualifications Framework and includes the training and education in the academic sector, vocational and technical sector, and the skills sector. Accreditation agencies include the Malaysian Qualifications Agency for qualifications in the academic and vocational and technical sectors, the Department of Skills Development (formerly the National Vocational Training Council) for the Malaysian Skills Certificate and Diploma qualifications as well as other recognised agencies like the Malaysian Nursing Board and self-accrediting universities and university colleges.

The list below is classified by their regulatory authorities, segmented by their locations according to states. For the purpose of this list, institutions that bear the status of universities and university colleges as per the provisions of the University and University Colleges Act 1971 and the Education Act 1996 are listed in a separate article. There might be some duplication in both lists as some institutions provide accredited training and education in multiple sectors are regulated by both bodies.

Ministry of Higher Education 
The institutions listed here are regulated by the Ministry of Higher Education. State owned and managed institutions of higher learning are bolded in the list below.

Department of Skills Development 
The institutions listed here are accredited centres of the Department of Skills Development. State owned and managed institutions of higher learning are bolded in the list below.

See also 
 Education in Malaysia
 List of universities in Malaysia
 Community college
 Ministry of Higher Education
 Malaysian Qualifications Agency
 Malaysian Qualifications Framework
 Department of Skills Development
 Lists of universities and colleges by country

References

External links 
 Private Higher Education Institution Directory
 Search for Accreditation Centre

Post-secondary
 
Malaysia
Malaysia